is a Japanese footballer who plays as a defensive midfielder or right back for  club FC Tokyo.

Career
Koizumi started his career as a junior player with Yokohama F. Marinos, but the club did not promote him to their Under-18 team. He entered Ryutsu Keizai University Kashiwa High School and started playing for the school. He subsequently became a regular in the school team that won the Prince Takamado Cup in 2013.

In 2014, Koizumi joined J. League Division 1 club Albirex Niigata and has added some versatility to the Albirex squad. His ability to play in a number of positions across defence and midfield made him an attractive proposition and boss Masaaki Yanagishita was delighted to be able to prise him away from The Big Swan Stadium.

Club statistics
.

References

External links
Profile at Sagan Tosu
Profile at Albirex Niigata

1995 births
Living people
Association football people from Tokyo
Japanese footballers
J1 League players
J2 League players
J3 League players
Albirex Niigata players
J.League U-22 Selection players
Kashiwa Reysol players
Kashima Antlers players
Sagan Tosu players
FC Tokyo players
Association football midfielders
Association football defenders